better known as  nicknamed Motchin was a Japanese singer and anisong singer. He is best known for his performances of the theme songs for the anime Galactic Whirlwind Sasuraiger, Pettonton, and Kyojuu Tokusou Juspion. Takano also sung the songs in Ai Shite Knight for the fictional in-story band, Bee Hive, even though the singer character, Gou, is voiced by singer Isao Sasaki.

Career and Bands
Takano was a part of several bands as well as having a successful solo career. He first joined the band  in 1967, where he served as the band's singer and drummer. Their debut single was a cover of The Zombies's song I Love You and renamed . The song was translated into Japanese by Ren Kenji. The band put out 10 singles and 2 albums before disbanding in 1969. In 1970, Takano joined the band The Golden Cups as their drummer. The band dissolved in 1972, having their last performance on January 1. Takano was featured on 2 singles and 2 albums for The Golden Cups. In the early 80s, Takano began his anisong career.

Albums

With the Carna Beats

Jaguars vs. Carna Beats (split album with The Jaguars) (August 1, 1967)
The Carna Beats First Album (February 16, 1968)

With The Golden Cups

The Fifth Generation The Golden Cups Album 8 (January 10, 1971)
Live!! Golden Cups (October 5, 1971)

Songs for Ai Shite Knight
Songs were released on the album Debut Bee Hive in Japan in June 1983.
Rockin' all night
Fire
Midnight Rock'n'Roll Star
Lonely Boy
Baby, I Love You
Freeway
Someday on Sunday
Love Again

References

External links
 Official Site of Ai Takano 

1951 births
2006 deaths
Singers from Tokyo
20th-century Japanese male singers
20th-century Japanese singers